Anuradhapura Central College is a mixed educational establishment in North Central Province, Sri Lanka.
Anuradhapura Central College is a national school, which provides secondary education.

History 
Anuradhapura Central College, which is considered as the heart of Anuradhapura, is situated in Anuradhapura, the capital city of North Central Province, Sri Lanka. It was established on 21 July 1947 under the initiative of R. L. N. de Zoyza in Rathmale area where the Rathmale Tissa Vidyalaya is situated today.

It was established to provide free education by the Minister of Education, Dr. C. W. W. Kannangara. It was the second Central College established in the North Central Province and one of the first 54 Central Colleges in the country. De Zoysa was the first principal and there were only seven teachers and twenty students in the school.

The school was later moved to its present location. In 1993 the school was promoted to a National School under the leadership of the then principal E. R. Erathna.   In 2014, H. M. Abeykoon was appointed as the principal of the college, with a staff of 190 teachers and 4,800 students.Present principal of Anuradhapura Central College is Mr. J.M.P.M. Jayasundara.

School traditions 

The College motto is "Asamu Daramu Haesirmu", meaning "Harken Memorise Act" in Sinhala. Its nickname is "Emeralds"

School Anthem 

Namadimu baethi gee kusum puda is the school song, which is sung at the start of the school day and on important occasions.

Houses 
The students are divided in to four houses, which are named after four great arahant theros. An annual track-and-field tournament among these houses is held during the first term of the academic year.
 Ananda  
 Mahinda 
 Seewali  
 Rahula

Notable alumni 

Anuradhapura Central College has produced graduates in many fields such as engineering, medicine, law, politics, education, administration, mass-media and entertainment, including:
 Duminda Dissanayake – Cabinet Minister of Education Services, former Deputy Minister of Youth Affairs and Skills Development
 Nanda Mallawaarachchi – Acting Commander of the Army, Former Ambassador of Sri Lanka in Indonesia
 Ran Banda Seneviratne – A lawyer, author, lyricist, television and radio presenter.
 Sirimevan Ranasinghe - Chief of Staff, Sri Lanka Navy
 Shirani Bandaranayake, 43rd Chief Justice of Sri Lanka
 Simon Navagattegama – a Sinhala novelist, Sinhala Radio Play writer, playwright and actor.

References

External links and sources 
 
 Emeralds Club – The young past pupil association of Anuradhapura central college
 Anuradhapura Sacred City

1947 establishments in Ceylon
National schools in Sri Lanka
Schools in Anuradhapura